Tin Tsz is an MTR Light Rail stop. It is located at ground level near the Tin Shing Road, near Tin Tsz Estate, in Tin Shui Wai, Yuen Long District, Hong Kong. It began service on 7 December 2003 and belongs to Zone 4 of single-ride tickets. It serves Tin Tsz Estate, Tin Lai Court, and Tin Yau Court.

References

MTR Light Rail stops
Former Kowloon–Canton Railway stations
Tin Shui Wai
Railway stations in Hong Kong opened in 2003
MTR Light Rail stops named from housing estates
2003 establishments in Hong Kong